Miss Haiti is a national Beauty pageant in Haiti. The pageant was founded in 1920, where the winners were sent to Miss Universe.

History 
Historically, the most notable contestants were Evelyn Miot and Gerthie David. On July 14, 1962, Evelyn Miot was the first black contestant to be one of the 15 semi-finalists in the Miss Universe Pageant. This was Miss Haiti's first international meet. Gerthie David competed in the Miss Universe Pageant in 1975 and placed in the finals, becoming runner up to Miss Finland, Anne Marie Pohtamo won the 1975 title. In 1975, Gerthie became the second black woman to be placed in the finals. In 1975 Joelle Apollon was declared Miss Haiti World to represent the country in Miss World Pageant, remaining as the fifth finalist, was the only time Haiti the sent a candidate a Miss World. The 1968 Miss Haiti Universe delegate, Claudie Paquin, was eliminated in the first round of Miss Universe. The last time Miss Haiti Universe competed in Miss Universe before 2010 was in 1989, the delegate was Glaphyra Jean-Louis.

In 2010, Haiti returned to the Miss Universe pageant under Magali Febles, who was also the franchise holder for Miss Universe in the Dominican Republic. She would end up having the franchise until 2015. 

In 2016, the license of Miss Universe was awarded to Chris Puesan a  pageant coach from the Dominican Republic, and end up having the franchise until 2018. Before the creation of Miss Haiti Organization was not common to see Haiti competing in international pageants but after the launch of the national competition Haiti is joining most of the pageants all over the world.

Pageant format 
The winner of Miss Haiti is crowned as Miss Universe Haiti and competes at Miss Universe. The remaining contestants continue on to the Miss International  contest, whose winner competes as Miss International Haiti.

Titleholders

Titleholders under Miss Haiti org.

Miss Universe Haiti

The following is a list of winners. From 1960 to Present. From 2013 to 2015 the Miss Haiti trademark officially awarded to Miss World Haiti. The winning title to Miss Universe had crowned by Magali Febles (National Director of Miss Haiti Universe between 2010 and 2015). Began 2016 the Miss Haiti Org. and the winner returned to compete at Miss Universe.

Past titleholders under Miss Haiti org.
Miss World HaitiFrom 2013 to 2017 the Miss Haiti trademark officially awarded to Miss Haiti under the directorship of Chris Puesan and Anedie Azael. Began 2018 Haitian representative will select at Miss World Haiti contest.Miss International HaitiThe Miss International Haiti title was awarding to one of runners-up at Miss Haiti pageant. Began 2022 Haitian representative will select in under outside Miss Haiti Organization.''

References

Beauty pageants in Haiti
Haiti
Recurring events established in 1962
Haitian awards